Davagudur is a village in Zarugumilli Mandal in Prakasam district of Andhra Pradesh State, India.

Villages in Prakasam district